Blackout is a 1950 British crime drama film directed by Robert S. Baker. The film featured Maxwell Reed, Dinah Sheridan, Patric Doonan, Kynaston Reeves, Annette D. Simmonds, Eric Pohlmann, Michael Evans and Michael Brennan in the lead roles.
The film includes the first featured appearance of Ronald Leigh-Hunt.

Plot
An engineer, Christopher Pelley, loses his eyesight in an accident but is due to have an operation to restore his sight. One night he goes to a friend's house but the driver drops him at the wrong address by mistake. Pelley goes inside and discovers a body, as well as a ring, on the floor but the three killers, who are still in the house, decide to simply knock him out once they realise he is blind and cannot identify them.

When Pelley comes round the police investigate his story but cannot locate the house or body, so after he regains his eyesight after the operation he decides to try to solve the mystery. He returns to the house to find Patricia Dale living there with her father and from a photo on the piano he realises that the ring belongs to her brother, Norman, who is presumed dead after a plane crash a year before.  Patricia agrees to investigate the mystery with Pelley, and they speak to Norman's friend Chalky, who was with Edward the night he was presumed to have died.  Chalky gives them a couple of leads, and when Pelley follows up one at a travel agency he meets Guy Sinclair who works there and whom Pelly recognises as one of the three men who knocked him out by his voice.

It becomes clear that the three men - Sinclair, a thug called Mickey and their leader, Otto - are involved in a smuggling ring, and Pelley manages to get hold of a book which, although in code, incriminates all three men in the smuggling racket.  Pelley tracks the crooks down to an isolated house, The Grange, but is caught by Mickey and held prisoner in the house but manages to escape with the help of Lila, a girlfriend of Norman's.  He enlists Chalky's help, and they go to see Lila, who has information for them, but she is killed by Mickey before they can speak to her.

Patricia disappears after receiving a message asking her to meet someone at midday, whilst Pelley realises that Chalky has been working with the gang all the time, but he is killed by mistake by the gang instead of Pelley.  Pelley then goes to find Patricia after telling her father to contact the police, and he finds her being held hostage at The Grange.  It then transpires that her brother Norman is alive and is actually the gang's ringleader who faked his own death to evade arrest; the body Pelley stumbled over in the house was that of a customs investigator.  Pelley manages to foil the gang and Norman falls to his death trying to escape from Pelley and the police, and Pelley and Patrica leave hand in hand.

Cast 

 Maxwell Reed as Chris Pelley
 Dinah Sheridan as Pat Dale
 Patric Doonan as Chalky
 Kynaston Reeves as Mr. Dale
 Annette D. Simmonds as Lila Drew
 Eric Pohlmann as Otto Ford
 Michael Evans as Guy Sinclair
 Michael Brennan as Mickey Garston
 Ernest Butcher as Benny
 Campbell Singer as Inspector
 Madoline Thomas as Housekeeper
 Basil Appleby as Norman Dale
 Ronald Leigh-Hunt as Dr. Langley
 Pat Metcalfe as Maid
 Ida Patlanski as Postmistress
 Jean Lodge as Nurse

Production 
Blackout was later remade as "Blind Spot", a British crime drama (1958 film), by the same producers, but a different director.

References

External links 

1950 crime drama films
1950 films
British crime drama films
British black-and-white films
Films directed by Robert S. Baker
1950s English-language films
1950s British films